XHPVTS-FM is a radio station on 98.5 FM in Villa de Tututepec de Melchor Ocampo, Oaxaca, Mexico, with transmitter on Cerro Vista Hermosa. It is known as W Radio.

History
XHPVTS was awarded in the IFT-4 radio auction of 2017. The station signed on the air in November 2018 and was formally inaugurated on December 13 of that year.

References

Radio stations in Oaxaca
Radio stations established in 2018
2018 establishments in Mexico